This is a list of active and extinct volcanoes.

References

Reunion
Volcanoes